Henry George Allport (born 1873) was an English professional footballer who played as a wing half. He played in the Football League for Middlesbrough and Middlesbrough Ironopolis. He is the only footballer to play for Middlesbrough and Ironopolis. He played in the 1895 and 1898 F.A. Amateur Cup Final's both won by Middlesbrough against Old Carthusians and Uxbridge. He was registered as a player for Middlesbrough from 1895 until 1900.

References

English footballers
Association football defenders
Middlesbrough F.C. players
Middlesbrough Ironopolis F.C. players
Year of death missing
1873 births